The Northern and Western Region has been a region in Ireland since 1 January 2015. It is a NUTS Level II statistical region of Ireland (coded IE04).

NUTS 2 Regions may be classified as less developed regions, transition regions, or more developed regions to determine eligibility for funding under the European Regional Development Fund and the European Social Fund Plus. In 2021, the Northern and Western Region was classified as a transition region.

The Northern and Western Regional Assembly is composed of members nominated from the local authorities in the region. It is one of three Regional Assemblies in Ireland established in 2015 following an amendment to the Local Government Act 1991, replacing 8 Regional Authorities with 3 Regional Assemblies. Its members are nominated from among the members of its constituent local authorities.

The Region contains two strategic planning areas, each of which is a NUTS Level III statistical region, and mostly correspond with the former Regional Authority Regions.

References

External link 
Northern and Western Regional Assembly

NUTS statistical regions of the Republic of Ireland
Local government in the Republic of Ireland
Department of Housing, Local Government and Heritage